233 Squadron or 233rd Squadron may refer to:

 No. 233 Squadron RAF, a unit of the United Kingdom Royal Air Force
 VMA-233, a unit of the United States Marine Corps